Guru Nanak College of Arts, Science and Commerce is situated in G. T. B. Nagar of Mumbai city.

About 
Guru Nanak College of Arts, Science and Commerce was established by Guru Nanak Vidyak Society in 1989.

References

Colleges in India
Universities and colleges in Mumbai
Memorials to Guru Nanak
Educational institutions established in 1989
1989 establishments in Maharashtra